Ivanovka is a rural locality (a selo) in Novokalitvenskoye Rural Settlement, Rossoshansky District, Voronezh Oblast, Russia. The population was 353 as of 2010. There are 19 streets.

Geography 
Ivanovka is located 56 km southeast of Rossosh (the district's administrative centre) by road. Novaya Kalitva is the nearest rural locality.

References 

Rural localities in Rossoshansky District